Rudolf Borisovich Barshai (September 28, 1924November 2, 2010) was a Soviet and Russian conductor and violist.

Life

Barshai was born on September 28, 1924, in Stanitsa Labinskaya, Krasnodar Krai, in modern-day Russia. He studied at the Moscow Conservatory under Lev Tseitlin and Vadim Borisovsky. He performed as a soloist with Sviatoslav Richter and David Oistrakh and as a member of a trio with Mstislav Rostropovich and Leonid Kogan. During his career Barshai won numerous Soviet and international competitions and was the founding violist of the Borodin Quartet in 1945, where he remained a member until 1953. He later studied conducting under Ilya Musin at the Leningrad Conservatory.

In 1955, Barshai founded the Moscow Chamber Orchestra, which he led and conducted until he emigrated to the West in 1977. He was the artistic director of the Israel Chamber Orchestra from 1978 to 1981. From 1981 until 1982, Barshai was principal conductor of Vancouver Symphony Orchestra and the Principal Guest Conductor of Orchestre National de France (National Orchestra of France) from 1985 to 1986. He was also the principal conductor of the Bournemouth Symphony Orchestra from 1982 to 1988 as well as the permanent Guest Conductor in many Orchestras of Europe, Canada, USA, Taiwan, and Japan. Barshai resided in Switzerland until his death in 2010.

Barshai's first wife was Nina Barshai (married 1947, divorced 1953), who became second violinist of the Borodin Quartet. They had a son, Lev Barshai (1946–2014). In 1954, Barshai married Anna Martinson (1928–2012), a Russian painter and costume designer and daughter of the Soviet comic Sergey Martinson. Together they had a son, Walter Barshai, born in 1955. The couple divorced in 1963 and, in 1968, Barshai married Japanese translator Teruko Soda (divorced 1974). They had a son, Takeshi, who was born on January 10, 1967. In 1980, Barshai married harpsichordist and organist Elena Raskova. They lived in Switzerland near Basel.

A biographical film about Barshai, The Note, was made in 2010 by Oleg Dorman. In 2013, the story was featured in the book The Note. In 2015, the English label ICA CLASSICS released a memorial project, the 20-CD A Tribute to Rudolf Barshai.

Work
Barshai achieved fame as a musical interpreter and arranger of Shostakovich's and Prokofiev's music. He is particularly noted for his arrangements of Shostakovich's string quartets, especially String Quartet No. 8, for chamber orchestra. In 2000, Barshai produced a performing version of Mahler's Tenth Symphony, which was left unfinished at the composer's death. Also, he recorded many Shostakovich's works, among which was the widely praised world premiere recording of the composer's Fourteenth Symphony. Many of his recordings earned critical acclaim and won international awards, including:
 1988 Gramophone Awards – Concerto: Tchaikovsky, Piano Concerto No. 2, Rudolf Barshai conducting Bournemouth Symphony Orchestra; solo: Peter Donohoe (with Nigel Kennedy and Steven Isserlis in the slow movement) (EMI)
 2003 Cannes Classical Music Award: Orchestral 20 Century: Shostakovich: Complete Symphonies; Barshai conducting WDR Symphony Orchestra Cologne (Brilliant Classics)
 2003 Editor's Award (ClassicsToday.com): Record of the Year: Shostakovich: Complete Symphonies; Barshai (Brilliant Classics).
The Rudolf Barshai International Strings Competition was established in 2020.

Recordings

Solo 
Ivan Khandoshkin: Concerto for Viola & Orchestra (in C Major). Moscow Chamber Orchestra, Rudolf Barshai, conductor and viola. Moderato, Canzona: Andante, Rondo: "La Chasse", Allegretto
J. S. Bach, Partita No. 2 in D minor, BWV 1004, Arranged for viola by Rudolf Barshai. Played on Stradivarius viola, recorded in 1960
J. S. Bach, Brandenburg Concerto No. 6 for 2 violas. Moscow Chamber Orchestra, live concert recording at the Moscow Conservatory. Rudolf Barshai, conductor and viola
Robert Schuman, Märchenbilder for viola and piano, Op. 113. Rudolf Barshai, solo viola, accompanied on piano by Vladimir Shreibman
Sergey Prokofiev, Five pieces from Romeo and Juliet, arranged for viola and piano by R. Barshai
Handel/Casadesus, viola concerto in B minor (arr. R. Barshai). Moscow Chamber Orchestra, R. Barshai, viola and conductor
Glinka, Mikhail Ivanovich, Sonata for Viola and Piano in D minor. Rudolf Barshai, viola, Tatiana Nikolayeva, piano

Ensembles

Beethoven – String Trios, Op. 9, No. 1 in G and No. 3 in C minor, with Leonid Kogan, M. Rostropovich. 1958/1958 Melodiya SUCD 10-00552
Glinka – Sonata for Viola and Piano in D minor, with Tatyana Nikolayeva. Multisonic 310236
Fauré – Piano Quartet No. 1 in C, Op. 15, with Emil Gilels, L. Kogan, M. Rostropovich. 1958/1958
Shostakovich – String Quartet No. 3 in F, Op. 73. 1954/1955 Russian Revelation RV10016
P. Tchaikovsky – String Sextet in D minor. Multisonic 310182

Conducting
Albinoni – Concerto for Oboe, Strings and Harpsichord in B-flat, Op. 7, No. 3. Russian Disc RD CD 10 062
J. Baur – Symphony Metamorphose, Cologne Radio Symphony Orchestra. 1994 THROFON CTH2270
Beethoven – Symphonies Nos. 1–8, Orchestra based on MCO. 1969–1975/1970–1976
Berg – Chamber Concert, O. Kagan, S. Richter, All-Union Radio and TV Large Symphony Orchestra. 1972/UR
J. S. Bach – Brandenburg Concertos 1, 2, 3 (Rostropovich, cello, 1958), 4 (D. Oistrakh, violin, 1957), 5, 6. 1973/76
Wer sich selbst erhöhet, Cantata BWV 47, Pisarenko, Vedernikov, Yurlov Choir. 1965/1966
"Gott soll allein mein Herze haben", aria from cantata BWV 68, "Murre nicht, lieber Christ", aria from cantata BWV 144, "Erbarme dich", aria from St Matthew Passion, BWV 244, Dolukhanova. 1958
Revol Bunin – Symphony No. 5, Op. 45, MPO. 1968/1970
Biber – Sonata a 6 vocal in B-flat, T. Dokshitser, trumpet, MCO. 1968/1970
Boccherini – Symphony in E-flat, MCO. 1960/1960
Brahms – Symphonies Nos. 2 & 4, Cologne Radio Sym. Orchestra, 1999. Laurel Record LR-903
Britten – Simple Symphony, Op. 4, MCO. 1962/1963
Bellini – Oboe Concerto in E-flat, E. Nepal, MCO. 1968/1970 Russian Disc RD CD 10 062
Debussy – Two Dances for Harp and Strings, O. Nardelli. 1965/1965
Hindemith – Ein Jäger aus Kurpfalz, Op. 45, No. 3, MCO. 1964/1965
Hummel – Trumpet Concerto in E-flat, T. Dokshitser, MCO. 1968/1970 BMG/RCA Victor #32045
J. Haydn – Symphonies. Nos. 45 "Farewell", 94 "Surprise", 95, 100 "Military", 101 "Clock", 102, 104 "London", MCO. 1965-1973/1965-1991 Melodiya SUCD 10-00224
M. Haydn – Symphony in G, MCO. 1976/1991
Handel – Concerto Grosso Op. 3, Nos. 4a & 5, and Op. 6, Nos. 10 & 12. 1959–1976/1959–1991
K. Karaev – Symphony No. 3, MCO. 1966/1966
Yu. Levitin – Oboe Concerto in E minor, Op. 50, Nepalo, MCO. 1967/1969
A. Lokshin – Symphonies Nos. 5, 7, 10, Songs of Margaret, MCO. 1971–1976/1971 UR Laurel Record LR-901
Mahler – Symphony No. 5, Junge Deutsche Philharmonie. 1999 Brilliant Classics
Symphony No. 6 in A minor, Yomiuri Nippon Symphony Orchestra. 1989 TOBU.
Symphony No. 9 in D, Moscow Radio Symphony Orchestra. 1993 BIS – BIS-CD-632
Symphony No. 10 (performing version by R. Barshai), Junge Deutsche Philharmonie. 2003 Brilliant Classics – 94040
Mozart – Symphonies Nos. 1, 10, 18, 20, 22, 24, 25, 28–41, in D, in B-flat, in G, MCO. 1961–1973/1961–1974
Mussorgsky – Night On Bald Mountain, Vancouver Symphony Orchestra. 1989 CBC 2-5083
Pergolesi – Stabat Mater, Pisarenko, Arkhipova,Yurlov Choir, MCO. 1966/1966
Prokofiev – Visions Fugitives, Op. 22, Nos. 1–15, arr. Barshai, MCO. 1962/1963
Piano Concerto No. 3 in C major, Op. 26, Mark Zeltser (piano), Cologne R.S. Orch. Laurel Record LR-904
J. Rääts – Concerto for Strings, Op. 16, MCO. 1963/1963
Rachmaninoff – Rhapsody on a Theme by Paganini, Op. 43, Mark Zeltser (piano), Cologne Radio Symphony Orchestra, Laurel Record LR-904
Schubert – Symphony No. 5 in B-flat, D485, MCO. 1964/1964
Shostakovich – Symphony No. 14, Op. 136, Miroshnikova, Vladimirov. MCO 1970/1970
Boris Tchaikovsky – Chamber Symphony in G-E, MCO. 1968/1969
P.Tchaikovsky – Symphony No. 6, Vancouver Symphony Orchestra. 1989 CBC 2-5083
Piano Concertos Nos. 2 & 3, Peter Donohoe (piano), Nigel Kennedy (violin), Steven Isserelis (cello), Bournemouth Symphony Orchestra. 1986,1987,1989 EMI CDC 7499392
Telemann – Concerto for 3 Oboes, 3 Violins and Strings in B-flat. 1965/1967 EMI 724356534025
Torelli – Violin Concerto in A minor, Op. 8, No. 9, Spivakov, solo, MCO. 1972/1973
M. Vainberg – Symphony No. 7, Op. 81, MCO. 1967/1969 OLYMPIA OCD 472
Vivaldi – Concerto in G minor RV577, MCO. 1971/1971
Verdi – Requiem, live in Waldbühne, Berlin, World Symphony Orchestra, Maryland Chorus, Shinyu-Kai Choir, Sveshnikov Choir. June 11, 1994; IPPNW-Concerts 2-CD

References

External links
 
 Biography – in Russian

1924 births
2010 deaths
Moscow Conservatory alumni
People from Labinsk
Russian classical violists
Russian conductors (music)
Russian male conductors (music)
Russian Jews
Soviet classical violists
Soviet Jews
Soviet emigrants to Israel